Chiradpada is a village in the Thane district of Maharashtra, India. It is located in the Bhiwandi taluka. It lies on the bank of Bhatsa River.

Demographics 

According to the 2011 census of India, Chiradpada has 264 households. The effective literacy rate (i.e. the literacy rate of population excluding children aged 6 and below) is 75.81%.

References 

Villages in Bhiwandi taluka